Mahmadsaid Ubaydulloyev (born 1 February 1952) is a Tajikistani politician who was Mayor of Dushanbe, the national capital, from 1996 to 2017. He had also served as Chairman of the Majlisi Milli (the upper chamber of the Tajik parliament) from 2000 until 2020. He was awarded the Order of Zarintoj 1st Class on January 13, 2016.

External links
Tajikistan local digest

Chairmen of the National Assembly of Tajikistan
Living people
People from Dushanbe
1956 births
People's Democratic Party of Tajikistan politicians
Mayors of Dushanbe

References